The Indian Cane Growers Association was formed on 28 September 1919 and was based in Ba Province, one of the cane growing districts in the Western Division of Fiji. It was led by Theodore Riaz and included some well-to-do Indian cane farmers from Ba, like Ramgarib Singh and Randhir Singh. The Association proposed a scheme for co-operative stores and an agricultural bank financed by the Colonial Sugar Refining Company but the company refused to finance it. The Association asked for a higher price and Indian cane farmers refused to plant any more cane. The company made concessions, although it refused to guarantee the price increases for future years. The company refused to continue the bonus in 1921 and in the ensuing strike, it was Vashist Muni who assumed leadership of all cane farmers in Fiji.

See also 
 Kisan Sangh
 Vishal Sangh
 Maha Sangh
 Federation of Cane Growers
 National Farmers Union of Fiji
 Sugar Cane farmers unions in Fiji

References 
 K.L. Gillion, The Fiji Indians: Challenge to European Dominance 1920-1946, Australian National University, 1977.

Cane growers unions of Fiji
Fiji Indian organisations
Colony of Fiji
1919 establishments in Fiji
Trade unions established in 1919
Economic history of Fiji